Bassozetus robustus, the robust assfish, is a species of cusk eel (Ophidiidae) found in deep tropical and temperate waters around the world.

References

Ophidiidae
Fish described in 1913